Spontaneous glass breakage is a phenomenon by which toughened glass (or tempered) may spontaneously break without any apparent reason.

Common causes 
The most common causes are:
 Internal defects within the glass such as nickel sulfide inclusions.
 Minor damage during installation such as nicked or chipped edges later developing into larger breaks normally radiating from point of defect.
 Binding of the glass in the frame, causing stresses to develop as the glass expands and contracts due to thermal changes or deflects due to wind.
 Thermal stresses in the glass.
 Inadequate glass thickness to resist wind load.

Installation damage 

While glass is being moved and installed, it is easy for the glaziers to nick or chip the edges of the glass with various tools. It is also possible for fasteners such as nails or screws used to attach glass stops to nick the glass edges if these fasteners are installed at an improper angle. These small nicks or chips may not result in immediate breakage. However, over time, as the glass expands and contracts, stress concentrations can develop around the nick, leading to breakage. In the case of tempered glass the entire unit usually breaks.

Binding in the frame 

Glass expands and contracts with changes in temperature and deflects due to wind, so almost all modern glass is set on resilient blocks at the bottom and with space for expansion at the sides and top. The gaskets holding the glass in the frame are also usually resilient to cushion the glass against wind buffeting. If no space is provided at the perimeter of the unit, the glass will bind against the frame, causing internal stresses to develop in the glass which can exceed the strength of glass, resulting in breakage.

Internal defects and inclusions in the glass 

Nickel sulfide inclusions ("stones") can be present in the glass. The most common cause of these inclusions is the use of stainless-steel machinery in the glassmaking and handling process. Small shavings of stainless steel containing nickel change structure over time and grow, creating internal stresses in the glass. When these stresses exceed the strength of the glass, breakage results. This type of breakage is almost always found in tempered glass and is indicated by a distinctive "figure eight" pattern, with each "loop" of the figure eight approximately 30 mm in diameter.

Alternatively, small pieces of refractory brick can be eroded by the molten glass from the internal walls of the furnace during processing and become embedded in the finished glass. These are also known as "stones", and can also break the glass when the glass is heated, as they create thermal anomalies.

Thermal stresses 

Breakage due to thermal stress is most common in large pieces of sealed insulating glass with heavy heat-absorbing (reflective) coatings. The coating is usually applied to the "number two" surface (the inside face of the outside lite). This causes the outside lite of glass to heat up more than the inside lite as the coating converts radiant heat from the Sun into sensible heat. As the outer lite expands due to heating, the entire unit bends outward. If the spacer bar or other edge condition connects the two lites of glass in a very rigid manner, bending stresses can develop which exceed the strength of the glass, causing breakage. This was the cause of extensive glass breakage at the John Hancock Tower in Boston.

Inadequate glass thickness 

A pane that is too large or thin, having not been properly engineered for wind loads on the site, can be broken by the wind. See Bernoulli's principle on wind.

Remedies 

Any breakage problem has more severe consequences where the glass is installed overhead or in public areas (such as in high-rise buildings). A safety window film can be applied to the tempered panes of glass to protect from its falling. An old-fashioned precaution was to install metal screens below skylights.

References 

American Society for Testing and Materials (ASTM):
ASTM E 2431 -- "Practice for Determining the Resistance of Single Glazed Annealed Architectural Flat Glass to Thermal Loadings".
ASTM E1300 -- "Standard Design Practice for Determining Load Resistance of Glass in Buildings".

Glass engineering and science
Glass physics